Adam's Wall is a 2008 Canadian drama film directed by Michael Mackenzie, who also co-wrote the film with Dana Schoel and produced by Ziad Touma of Couzin Films and by Olivier Sirois. The film's original music is composed by Benoît Charest. The film was released in Montreal on October 17, 2008.

The film stars Jesse Aaron Dwyre as Adam Levy, Flavia Bechara as Yasmine Gibran, Paul Ahmarani as Najeeb Gibran, Gabriel Gascon as Rabbi Levy, Tyrone Benskin as Mostafa and Maxim Roy as Christine. Younger Adam is played by Kyler Nesrallah.

Synopsis
In Mile End, Montreal, Adam Levy, a Jewish teenager, falls in love with Yasmine Gibran, a Lebanese girl… On his way to audition for music school, Adam meets Yasmine, who is participating in a student protest. When the demonstration gets out of hand, they are thrown together in the rush to evacuate the school. He might have missed his audition, but instead he's met the girl of his dreams! Adam, handsome and shy, and Yasmine, exquisite and passionate, are instantly drawn to one another.

Their love grows, but complications arise. Adam fears that his orthodox Rabbi grandfather, who he's lived with since his parents were killed in Israel, will stop at nothing to end his relationship with "the Arab girl". The renewed conflict in the Middle East feels closer and closer to home, as Yasmine's life dives into a tailspin when she learns that her mother has gone missing in bombarded Beirut. The young lovers' fight to stay together proves more difficult by the day. The deeper they fall for each other, the more their families feel betrayed.

Cast

References

Information provided by Couzin Films production company, October 2008

External links 
 Official film website
 
 Couzin Films website (producer)

2008 films
English-language Canadian films
2000s English-language films
Canadian romantic drama films
Quebec films
2008 romantic drama films
Films set in Montreal
Films shot in Montreal
2000s Canadian films